The 2017 Fayetteville mayoral election took place on November 7, 2017 to elect the mayor of Fayetteville, North Carolina. It saw the election of Mitch Colvin, who unseated incumbent mayor Nat Robertson.

Results

Primary
The primary was held October 10, 2017.

General election

References

2017
2017 North Carolina elections
2017 United States mayoral elections